I Know You Know is a film.

I Know You Know may also refer to:
 "I Know You Know", a song from the album BTR by Big Time Rush
 "I Know You," a song by Skylar Grey
 "I Know, You Know (Psych)", the theme song of the television series Psych by The Friendly Indians
 I Know You Know, the 1974 debut album by Meg Christian
 "I Know U Know", a song by Basshunter from Bass Generation
 "I Know You Know", a song from the show Produce 101 Season 2
 "I Know, You Know", a song by Gotthard from Need to Believe
 "I Know You Know", a song by Esperanza Spalding from Esperanza